McCauley Conner (November 12, 1913 – September 26, 2019) was an American commercial illustrator who was called "one of the original Mad Men". He turned 100 in November 2013.

Mac Conner was born as Julian McCauley Conner to his parents, Ross C. Conner and Maude, and grew up in Newport, New Jersey.  His parents operated a general store in Downes Township, New Jersey.  By 1940, Mac Conner was operating a commercial art business.

References

External links
  Mac Conner at Norman Rockwell Museum, Illustration history.
  The original Mad Man: Illustrations by Mac Conner, at Delaware Art Museum.
  The original Mad Man at the Delaware Art Museum.
  Julian McCauley "Mac" Conner at findagrave.com.
  Video, First Experience: Mac Conner, The Delaware Art Museum exhibit, WHYY TV.
  Video, Mac Conner: A New York Life, Norman Rockwell Museum.

1913 births
2019 deaths
American centenarians
American illustrators
Men centenarians